Morphinan is the prototype chemical structure of a large chemical class of psychoactive drugs, consisting of opiate analgesics, cough suppressants, and dissociative hallucinogens, among others.

Structure 
Morphinan has a phenanthrene core structure with the A ring remaining aromatic and the B and C rings being saturated, and an additional nitrogen-containing, six-membered, saturated ring, the D ring, being attached to carbons 9 and 13 of the core, and with the nitrogen being at position 17 of the composite.

Of the major naturally occurring opiates of the morphinan type—morphine, codeine and thebaine—thebaine has no therapeutic properties (it causes seizures in mammals), but it provides a low-cost feedstock for the industrial production of at least four semi-synthetic opiate agonists, including hydrocodone, hydromorphone, oxycodone and oxymorphone, and the opioid antagonist naloxone.

Structure-activity relationship 
The physiological behavior of morphinans (naturally occurring and semi-synthetic derivatives) is thought to be associated with the aromatic A ring, the nitrogen-containing D ring and the "bridge" between these two rings formed by carbons 9, 10 and 11 of the core, with the D ring "above" the core (levorotatory).

Small groups are usually found on morphinan derivatives at carbons 3 and 6.

Many such derivatives have an epoxy group between carbons 4 and 5 (i.e., 4,5α-epoxy), thereby forming an E ring.

The substitution of certain bulky groups on nitrogen 17 converts an opioid agonist into an opioid antagonist, the most important of which is naloxone, a non-selective opioid antagonist with no opioid agonist properties whatsoever ("silent" antagonist). Additionally, substitution of certain very bulky groups on carbon 6 converts naloxone into a peripherally-selective opioid antagonist with no centrally-selective antagonist properties (naloxegol).

The addition of a two-carbon bridge between carbons 6 and 14 (e.g., 6,14-ethano, or 6,14-etheno), and which significantly distorts the C ring, may increase potency 1,000 to 10,000 times, or greater, compared to morphine, as in etorphine, and others. The relative potency is thought to be associated with the degree of distortion of the C ring, and is perhaps greatest in diprenorphine, where this group is α,α-dimethyl-6,14-etheno. Diprenorphine (M5050) is the recommended etorphine (M99) antagonist, but it is not a pure opioid antagonist (i.e., it is also a weak opioid agonist), so naloxone remains a significant therapeutic tool in suspected cases of opioid overdose. See also Bentley compounds.

If the D ring is "below" the core (dextrorotatory), the analgesic and euphoric properties are eliminated or are dramatically reduced, but the cough-suppressant property is retained, as in dextromethorphan.

Chemical derivatives 
Immediate derivatives of morphinan include:

 3-Hydroxymorphinan
 3-Methoxymorphinan
 Butorphanol
 Cyclorphan
 Dextrallorphan
 Dextromethorphan
 Dextrorphan
 Dimemorfan
 Ketorfanol
 Levallorphan
 Levofurethylnormorphanol
 Levomethorphan
 Levophenacylmorphan
 Levorphanol
 Norlevorphanol
 Racemethorphan
 Racemorphan
 Oxilorphan
 Phenomorphan
 Proxorphan
 Xorphanol

More distant of derivatives include:

 Cyprodime
 Drotebanol
 Nalbuphine
 Sinomenine

As well as the following:

 Morphine (and naturally occurring and semi-synthetic analogues)

 Naloxone

 Naloxegol

Chemical relatives 
The following structures are related to morphinan:
 Benzylisoquinoline
 Hasubanan
 Hasubanonine

References 
 Brunton L L, Blumenthal D K, Murri N, Dandan R H, Knollmann B C. Goodman & Gilman's The Pharmacological Basis of Therapeutics. 12th ed. New York: McGraw-Hill, 2011. .

 
Opioids